HIV/AIDS in Argentina was considered a concentrated epidemic by 2012. The prevalence of human immunodeficiency virus (HIV) in the general population is less than 1% although in some groups this percentage is 6%, while in others there is a major incidence. Considering the whole country, 70% of cases are concentrated in the provinces of Buenos Aires, Santa Fe, Córdoba and the Autonomous City of Buenos Aires.

According to the 2012 AIDS Epidemiological Bulletin, Bureau of AIDS and Sexually Transmitted Diseases (DSyETS in Spanish) under the Ministry of Health of the Nation, 5,500 new HIV cases are reported in Argentina every year; 90% of them acquired the virus by having sex without a condom. There are about 110,000 people infected with HIV in Argentina, of whom only 50% know their status. Of these, only 47,000 are under treatment, 69% in the public service and the rest covered by private health insurance plans.

Statistics 
In 1982 the first patient with AIDS was reported in the country. Since that year the Ministry of Health keeps records of cases; until mid-2000, more than 17,000 patients (12,732 men, 3,074 women and 1,214 children under 15 years) were reported.

In 1987, it was reported the first case of a woman infected with HIV.

In 2019, UNAIDS estimates placed the number of people living with HIV at about 140,000.

See also 

 HIV/AIDS in South America
 Health in Argentina

References